The Fisher–Nash–Griggs House, also known as the Cottage Home, is a historic high-style Greek Revival house in the city of Ottawa, Illinois, United States. It was added to the U.S. National Register of Historic Places in 1998.

History
The Fisher–Nash–Griggs House, named for its first three owners, was built c. 1852–57 on Ottawa Avenue in Ottawa, Illinois. Between its construction and 1916 the home underwent a number of additions and renovations, all styled in Classical or Greek Revival.

George Smith Fisher had the northern part of the house built in the mid-1850s. It is thought to have been designed by Sylvanius Grow, who also designed the nearby John Hossack House. At some point before 1857, the Fishers added a dining room on the south. The house was expanded again in the early 1860s, extending farther south and adding a western bedroom and a summer kitchen. John Fiske Nash purchased the house in the 1870s and added a bathroom and vault area on the west wing. In 1910, the added an eastern bathroom, then extended the front porch with Ionic order columns two years later. In 1915, they added the porte-cochere on the east. The next year, they extended the east side and added a second floor. These were the last significant changes to the architecture of the house.

Architecture
Ottawa Avenue is divided by a grassy tree-dotted median which is crowned on its west end by a Classical Revival war memorial. The house, of brick construction, is an example of high-style Greek Revival architecture.

Historic significance
The house is significant for its architecture as a good local example of high-style Greek Revival architecture with Classical Revival updates. The Fisher–Nash–Griggs House was added to the U.S. National Register of Historic Places on November 27, 1998.

See also
John Hossack House

References

External links

Fisher–Nash-Griggs House, Property Information Report, Illinois Historic Preservation Agency, accessed May 12, 2008.

Houses in LaSalle County, Illinois
National Register of Historic Places in LaSalle County, Illinois
Ottawa, Illinois
Houses on the National Register of Historic Places in Illinois